Ron Williams (30 June 1917 – 11 December 1987) was an  Australian rules footballer who played with St Kilda in the Victorian Football League (VFL).

Notes

External links 

1917 births
1987 deaths
Australian rules footballers from Victoria (Australia)
St Kilda Football Club players